The Pakistan national cricket team toured India in  1983–84 season. The two teams played three Tests. All the test matches were drawn. Both teams also played 2 ODI, India won both the matches.

Test matches

1st Test

2nd Test

3rd Test

One Day Internationals (ODIs)

India won the wills series 2-0.

1st ODI

2nd ODI

References

External links
 Cricarchive
 Tour page CricInfo
 Record CricInfo

1983 in Pakistani cricket
1983 in Indian cricket
Indian cricket seasons from 1970–71 to 1999–2000
International cricket competitions from 1980–81 to 1985
1983-84